The Roman Catholic Diocese of Nazaré is a diocese located in the city of Nazaré da Mata in the Ecclesiastical province of Olinda e Recife in Brazil.

History
 August 2, 1918: Established as Diocese of Nazaré from the Metropolitan Archdiocese of Olinda e Recife

Bishops
 Bishops of Nazaré (Roman rite), in reverse chronological order
 Bishop Francisco de Assis Dantas de Lucena (2016.07.13 -
 Bishop Severino Batista de França, O.F.M. Cap. (2007.03.07 – 2015.11.25)
 Bishop Jorge Tobias de Freitas (1986.11.07 – 2006.07.26)
 Bishop Manuel Lisboa de Oliveira (1963.02.25 – 1986.11.07)
 Bishop Manuel Pereira da Costa (1959.06.20 – 1962.08.23)
 Bishop João de Souza Lima (later Archbishop) (1955.02.06 – 1958.01.16)
 Bishop Carlos Gouvêa Coelho (later Archbishop) (1948.01.10 – 1954.12.14)
 Bishop Riccardo Ramos de Castro Vilela (1919.07.03 – 1946.08.16)

Auxiliary bishop
Jaime Mota de Farias (1982-1986), appointed Bishop of Alagoinhas, Bahia

Other priests of this diocese who became bishops
João da Matha de Andrade e Amaral, appointed Bishop of Cajazeiras, Paraiba in 1934
Gentil Diniz Barreto, appointed Bishop of Mossoró, Rio Grande do Norte in 1960
Manoel dos Reis de Farias, appointed Bishop of Patos, Paraiba in 2001
Limacêdo Antônio da Silva, appointed Auxiliary Bishop of Olinda e Recife, Pernambuco in 2018

References
 GCatholic.org
 Catholic Hierarchy
 Diocese website (Portuguese) 

Roman Catholic dioceses in Brazil
Christian organizations established in 1918
Nazare, Roman Catholic Diocese of
Roman Catholic dioceses and prelatures established in the 20th century
Pernambuco